Neobaclea is a monotypic genus of flowering plants belonging to the family Malvaceae. It only contains one known species, Neobaclea crispifolia (Cav.) Krapov.

Its native range is southern Argentina.

The genus name of Neobaclea is in honour of César Hipólito Bacle (1794–1838), a Swiss naturalist, lithographer and periodicals publisher. He also collected plants, animals, minerals and cultural materials in South America and elsewhere. The Latin specific epithet of crispifolia 
is a portmanteau word, with crispus referring to curled and also folia which refers to foliage.
The genus was first described and published in Compt. Rend. Hebd. Séances Acad. Sci. Vol.189 on page 1300 in 1929, then the species Neobaclea crispifolia was first published in Darwiniana Vol.7 on page 108 in 1945.

References

Malveae
Malvaceae genera
Plants described in 1929
Flora of Argentina